National Highway 149 is a national highway of India.

Route 
Palalaharha - Talcher - Nuahata

References

National highways in India